Anfinn Kallsberg (born 19 November 1947) is a Faroese politician, former prime minister, and the former leader of the People's Party. First elected to the Faroese parliament in 1980 and consecutively since then, Kallsberg served as Fisheries Minister from 1983 to 1985 and for 5 months in Jógvan Sundstein's first coalition government in 1989, and as Economics and Finance Minister from 1996 to 1998 in a coalition led by Edmund Joensen (Union Party).

He was Speaker of the Løgting 1991–1993.

Kallsberg became Prime Minister of the Faroe Islands on 15 May 1998 in a coalition formed by the People's Party, Republican Party and the Self-Government Party. His first administration aimed for economic and legal independence of the Faroe Islands and started a process of assuming various governmental sectors from the Danish government. Likewise, Denmark set up a plan to grant full sovereignty to the Faroe Islands. In 2002 the coalition went through parliamentary elections that resulted in the entry of the Center Party into the government, which was the second cabinet of Anfinn Kallsberg.

In December 2003, Kallsberg took over the ministries previously served by members of the Republican Party and issued a new election that took place in January 2004. In 2005 Kallsberg was elected as one of two Faroese citizens to represent the islands in the Danish Parliament.

External links
 Anfinn Kallsberg's site at the Faroese Peoples Party 

1947 births
Living people
Prime Ministers of the Faroe Islands
Finance Ministers of the Faroe Islands
Fisheries Ministers of the Faroe Islands
Faroese members of the Folketing
Members of the Løgting
Members of the Folketing
People's Party (Faroe Islands) politicians
Speakers of the Løgting